Leonid Ivanovich Kalashnikov (born August 6, 1960) is a deputy for the Communist Party in the 7th State Duma of the Russian Federation. He is the head of the committee on Commonwealth of Independent States Affairs,
Eurasian Integration and Relations with Compatriots.

Kalashnikov was sanctioned by the United States Department of the Treasury following the 2022 Russian invasion of Ukraine.

References 

1960 births
21st-century Russian politicians
Anti-Romanian sentiment
Living people
Russian communists
Communist Party of the Russian Federation members
Communist Party of the Soviet Union members
Recipients of the Medal of the Order "For Merit to the Fatherland" II class
Fifth convocation members of the State Duma (Russian Federation)
Sixth convocation members of the State Duma (Russian Federation)
Seventh convocation members of the State Duma (Russian Federation)
Eighth convocation members of the State Duma (Russian Federation)
Russian individuals subject to European Union sanctions
Russian individuals subject to the U.S. Department of the Treasury sanctions